Water's Soul is a sculpture along the Hudson River Waterfront Walkway in the Newport section of Jersey City. It depicts a woman with closed eyes holding a finger to her lips in a state of silent contemplation and self-reflection. The work was conceived by Jaume Plensa and commissioned by LeFrak and Simon Property Group. It faces the Hudson River and the New York City skyline. It was created at Plensa's Barcelona studio and shipped in 23 containers, each  feet long, to the site.

Of the work, Plensa stated, "It is my wish for Water’s Soul to become an icon for Newport and a landmark that visually connects it with New York City across the Hudson River. Just as Water’s Soul acts to unite the city of Jersey City and New York City, we are reminded that water is the great public space that unites and embraces communities as well as people around the world." "The water, when it moves, makes a special sound, very special," Plensa said in an interview, suggesting the sculpture's message is "to keep silent...to listen to the profound noise of the water talking to us."

See also
List of public art in Jersey City, New Jersey
Dream (sculpture)
Behind the Walls (sculpture)

References

Culture of Jersey City, New Jersey
Outdoor sculptures in New Jersey
Monuments and memorials in New Jersey
2021 sculptures
Buildings and structures in Jersey City, New Jersey
Tourist attractions in Jersey City, New Jersey
Statues in New Jersey
Sculptures of women in New Jersey
2020 establishments in New Jersey
Public art in Jersey City, New Jersey
Sculptures by Jaume Plensa
Colossal statues in the United States